Tony O'Dowd (born 6 July 1970 in Dublin, Ireland), is a retired goalkeeper.

Career
O'Dowd made his League of Ireland debut for Shelbourne on the opening day of the 1990-91 League of Ireland season.

The 2007 season marked O'Dowd's second spell with Shelbourne, having started his league career with where he won his first under 21 international cap before being signed by Leeds United. He returned from Leeds and played with Kilkenny City, St. Patrick's Athletic, Derry City, Shamrock Rovers, Drogheda United and Malahide United before returning to the Reds. In the 2007 Season with Shelbourne, O'Dowd made 25 league appearances and delivered many impressive displays. Despite impressing in his second spell at Tolka Park, O'Dowd was released by Shelbourne at the end of the 2007 season.

At Derry O'Dowd was sent off against PFC Lokomotiv Sofia in the 1995-96 UEFA Cup Winners' Cup.

O'Dowd made his Rovers debut keeping a clean sheet against his old club in September 1998.

He signed for Drogheda in January 2004.

Tony played one game for his work team, Pfizer Pfootball Pfive, in a 5-a-side tournament in Tallaght. After not conceding during the game, he then again retired.

Personal life

O'Dowd's father also Tony played in goal for St Patrick's Athletic and Dundalk F.C. in the 1960s.

His brother Greg played for Rovers in the late 90s. He also played for Coleraine F.C. where he scored in the 1997-98 UEFA Cup.

In May 1997 tragedy hit the O'Dowd family when Tony's 18-year-old brother Conor died while training with his two brothers. O'Dowd did not play in the 1997 FAI Cup Final.

Honours
 League of Ireland: 1
 1996–97 League of Ireland - Derry City
SRFC Player of the Year:
 Shamrock Rovers – 1998/99
Yorkshire Regional Masters Football Champion:
 Leeds United Masters - 2011

References

External links
Tony O'Dowd's profile at www.shelbournefc.com

Republic of Ireland association footballers
Living people
1970 births
Association footballers from County Dublin
League of Ireland players
Shelbourne F.C. players
Leeds United F.C. players
Kilkenny City A.F.C. players
St Patrick's Athletic F.C. players
Derry City F.C. players
Shamrock Rovers F.C. players
Drogheda United F.C. players
Association football goalkeepers
Republic of Ireland under-21 international footballers
Malahide United F.C. players